Eyes of Crystal is a 2004 international co-production thriller film directed by Eros Puglielli. The film is about a police inspector Amaldi (played by Luigi Lo Cascio) who must hunt down a sadistic serial killer.

Cast 
 Luigi Lo Cascio - Inspector Giacomo Amaldi
 Lucía Jiménez - Giuditta
 José Ángel Egido - Frese
 Simón Andreu - Detective Ajaccio
 Carmelo Gómez - Professor Avildsen
 Eusebio Poncela - Dr. Civita
 Branimir Miladinov - Avildsen as a Child
 Tzvetan Philipov - Ajaccio as a Child
 Ernestina Chinova - Dr. Cerusico
 Hristo Zhivkov - Detective Di Fusco
 Dessy Tenekedjieva - Lucia

References

External links 

2000s erotic thriller films
Bulgarian thriller films
Italian erotic thriller films
Spanish erotic thriller films
British erotic thriller films
2000s British films